Charles "Charlie" Henry Gettig (December 1, 1870 – April 11, 1935) was an American professional baseball player who played four Major league seasons between  and .
He was born in Baltimore, Maryland and died there at the age of 64.

External links

Major League Baseball pitchers
Baseball players from Baltimore
New York Giants (NL) players
1870 births
1935 deaths
19th-century baseball players
Hanover Tigers players
Newark Colts players
Shreveport Giants players
Baltimore Orioles (IL) players
Rochester Bronchos players
Schenectady Electricians players
Scranton Miners players
Syracuse Stars (minor league baseball) players
East Liverpool (minor league baseball) players
Richmond Colts players
Lynchburg Shoemakers players
Norfolk Tars players
Goldsboro Giants players